Esther Domínguez (April 23, 1981, Zaragoza, Province of Zaragoza) is a Spanish rhythmic gymnast.

Dominguez competed for Spain in the rhythmic gymnastics individual all-around competition at the 2000 Summer Olympics in Sydney. There she was 11th in the qualification and didn't advance to the final of 10 competitors.

References

External links 
 Esther Domínguez at Sports-Reference.com

1981 births
Living people
Spanish rhythmic gymnasts
Gymnasts at the 2000 Summer Olympics
Olympic gymnasts of Spain
Sportspeople from Zaragoza
Competitors at the 2001 World Games